The following are fictional characters in Disney's 1959 film Sleeping Beauty.

Princess Aurora

Princess Aurora is the title character of the film. After Maleficent, an evil fairy curses her when she is only a baby, Aurora is taken to the woods by Flora, Fauna, and Merryweather, where her name is changed to Briar Rose to conceal her identity from Maleficent. Aurora is the third official Disney Princess.

Later in the story, the three good fairies are preparing for her birthday when they plan to surprise her with the news that she is a princess. But when Princess Aurora renamed Briar Rose returns with the news of meeting a handsome and enchanting man, the fairies must tell her she can never see him again; like Aurora, they do not know who he really is. The three fairies tell her about the future that is set for her and that night they take her back to the castle. Aurora is saddened that she will never see the man from the forest and breaks into tears. The three fairies exit the room they secretly entered so as to let the princess have a few moments alone. Aurora suddenly sees a floating spark of light cast by Maleficent and, in a trance, follows the spark through the back of the fireplace and up a staircase to a tower room where the spark of light turns into a spinning wheel. The three good fairies try to stop her, but are too late when Aurora pricks her finger on the spindle and collapses in sleep. She is put in a bed by the fairies where she can sleep peacefully within the highest tower.

Aurora is later awakened by Phillip's kiss of true love, which finally breaks the curse. She also learned that her love and her betrothed were exactly the same person. During the movie's final scenes, Aurora and Phillip dance.

Maleficent

Maleficent is the "Mistress of All Evil" who, after not being invited to a christening, curses the infant Princess Aurora to "prick her finger on the spindle of a spinning wheel and die" before the sun sets on her sixteenth birthday. Merryweather was able to weaken the curse though by changing it from death to sleep.

The night when Aurora returned to her father's castle, the moment Aurora was alone, Maleficent seized the chance to lure her into pricking her finger on the spinning wheel's spindle. Despite the efforts of the three good fairies, she succeeded in fulfilling her curse. She then proceeded to trap Prince Phillip and lock him in her dungeon. However, the three good fairies free Phillip after she left him. Upon learning of this from her pet raven, who got turned to stone in the process by Merryweather, she tried to stop him with a series of lightning bolts, but failed. She went as far as conjuring a forest of thorns, but Phillip easily cut his way to the gate. With no other choice, she flew to the gate of King Stefan's castle and turned into a huge dragon to battle the prince herself. Despite pushing Phillip to the edge of a cliff, Phillip threw his Sword of Truth, which was blessed by the three good fairies' magic, and struck Maleficent directly in the heart, and it was more than enough to kill her. All that was left of her was a black and purple mess on the ground, with the sword still embedded in it as it blackens.

Flora, Fauna and Merryweather

Flora, Fauna and Merryweather are the good fairy godmothers. They are based on the good fairies appearing in the original French fairy tale and various retellings. Like their fairy tale counterparts, Flora, Fauna and Merryweather appear at baby Aurora's christening to present their gifts to the newborn Princess Aurora. Their wings are very small. They use their magical powers to help both Princess Aurora and Prince Phillip.

Prince Phillip 

Prince Phillip is Aurora's true love, voiced by Bill Shirley. Phillip is based on the prince from the original French fairy tale that appears a hundred years after the princess is put to sleep by Maleficent's curse, having heard the story of the sleeping princess, and entered the castle. He trembled upon seeing the princess's beauty and fell on his knees before her. He kissed her, then she woke up, and then everyone lived happily ever after. Unlike The Prince from Snow White and the Seven Dwarfs and Prince Charming from Cinderella, Phillip was the first prince in Disney theatrical animated features to be given a proper name and a full character.

At Aurora's birth, it was said that Phillip would marry the princess, the daughter of his father's best friend. A young Phillip presents a gift to the infant Aurora at her christening, but is less than impressed when he sees her. The event is interrupted by Maleficent, who appears and curses Aurora, causing the Three Good Fairies to take Aurora into the forest to raise her. Years later, Phillip is riding in the forest and hears Aurora, now known as Briar Rose, singing. He follows her voice and starts singing with her. She tries to run away, but he follows her. By the end of the song, they have fallen in love. However, Aurora realizes she is disobeying her "aunts" and leaves, but not before telling Phillip she will be celebrating her birthday at her cottage in the middle of the forest. After being captured by Maleficent and thrown into her dungeon after arriving at Briar Rose's home, the Three Good Fairies rescue him so that he in turn can save Aurora. Phillip escapes Maleficent's castle and is the target of Maleficent's fury, who hurls lightning bolts (and later conjures a forest of thorns) at him. At the gates of the castle, Phillip battles Maleficent, who has turned into a dragon. Phillip is victorious and slays Maleficent with the Sword of Truth. He kisses Aurora and she wakes up. They then go downstairs, arm in arm, and share a dance after Aurora meets her parents.

In Disney Princess Enchanted Tales: Follow Your Dreams, Phillip is one of the characters from Sleeping Beauty to make an appearance, now voiced by Roger Craig Smith. At the beginning of the "Keys to the Kingdom" segment, Phillip is set to leave the kingdom along with his father and Aurora's parents for two days for a Royal Conference, leaving Aurora to reign over it in their absence. Before departing, Phillip encourages Aurora to do a good job while in charge of the kingdom and tells her to look at the brightest star at night, as he will be doing the same. Phillip returns at the end of the segment and is part of the celebration for Aurora's duty.

Phillip also appears in Disney/Square's Kingdom Hearts Birth by Sleep in his homeworld, "Enchanted Dominion". He is voiced by Josh Robert Thompson. Phillip plays a very similar role to that of the original film, meeting Aurora at the forest and singing along with her. Later, Phillip fights along with Aqua, an original character from the video game, in the battle against Maleficent's goons, and Maleficent in her dragon form. Phillip defeats Maleficent with his sword; however, unlike the film, Maleficent is not killed, but merely weakened to the point that she reverts to her first form. Phillip goes on to kiss Aurora and break Maleficent's spell on her. In the original Kingdom Hearts, Enchanted Dominion has been swallowed by the Heartless, and Phillip himself has disappeared, but is presumably restored after Sora defeats "Ansem" at the end of the game.

Phillip is one of the many Disney characters that appear in the TV series Disney's House of Mouse. He also appears in theme-parks and live events. Phillip is featured in the "Disney Heroes" franchise, a toyline similar but much less successful than the Disney Princess franchise. Phillip and Maleficent in dragon form appear in stylized versions, somehow different from their regular appearance.

Prince Phillip also appeared in Disney's 2014 live-action film Maleficent, this time portrayed by Brenton Thwaites. Here the teenage Phillip has been sent by his father, King John of Ulstead, to King Stefan's castle on a business matter. Phillip encounters Aurora along the way, and a sibling-like fondness develops between the royal youngsters. Although they do not marry in the end, Aurora's and Phillip's relationship is left with the potential to become something deeper. In Maleficent: Mistress of Evil, Harris Dickinson portrayed Phillip since Thwaites was unable to reprise the role due to scheduling conflicts.

King Stefan

King Stefan is Aurora's father, voiced by Taylor Holmes in his last role, replacing Hans Conried (who ironically happens to be the live action model for Stefan) for the voice role. The King is happily married to Queen Leah and is delighted with the birth of their daughter. A celebration is held to present Aurora to the kingdom. Announced by the herald, Stefan's closest friend, King Hubert, attends the celebration, during which Aurora is betrothed to Hubert's young son, Prince Phillip. The evil fairy Maleficent appears and very angry at everyone for being omitted from the celebration. She curses the infant Aurora to die on her sixteenth birthday by pricking her finger on a spinning wheel spindle as retribution for being uninvited. One of Aurora's fairy godmothers, Merryweather, was able to temper the curse's deadly effect and the fairies later offer to hide Aurora until after her sixteenth birthday. Still fearful of his daughter’s life, Stefan decrees all spinning wheels in the kingdom burned, though Flora, Merryweather, and Fauna knew that this will not stop Maleficent. Stefan, Leah, and the kingdom are saddened by Aurora's absence.

Sixteen years pass and the King and Queen prepare for Aurora's return. Stefan and Hubert discuss their respective kingdoms' futures and Aurora and Prince Phillip's impending marriage.  Stefan prefers the couple spend time together before being wed while Hubert has already had a new castle made ready for them. Later, Stefan and the entire kingdom wait for Aurora's arrival, unaware she has already pricked her finger into a cursed slumber that only true love's kiss can awaken. To protect everyone from being heartbroken, the fairies put a sleeping spell all over the entire kingdom, including Stefan, his wife, and Hubert. At the end, everyone, including Stefan, his wife, and Hubert awakens and he and his wife are reunited with Aurora. He later watches her dancing with Prince Phillip, along with his wife and Hubert.

In Disney Princess Enchanted Tales: Follow Your Dreams, King Stefan, now voiced by Corey Burton, departs with Queen Leah, King Hubert and Prince Phillip to a Royal Conference, leaving Princess Aurora to rule the kingdom. He is seen at the end of the first segment as he is about to enter his castle when his majordomo, Lord Duke, warns him against entering. The hall is filled with animals, a situation that is solved by Aurora just before Stefan enters. He attends the celebration that Aurora has organized, along with his wife, Hubert, Phillip, the fairies, and Lord Duke.

In Disney's live-action 2014 film Maleficent, King Stefan is portrayed by Sharlto Copley. As an orphaned farm boy, Stefan became Maleficent's childhood companion, but his ambition to become king resulted in him betraying Maleficent. He severed her wings to win the dying King Henry's favor. Due to Aurora's curse, and his murderous grudge against Maleficent, King Stefan becomes a ruthless tyrant and a tragic villain...in contrast to his wise, funny, and kind persona in the animated film.

Queen Leah

Queen Leah and her husband Stefan are the monarchs of an unnamed European kingdom, presumably in Medieval France, though the film doesn't specify the name or location of their realm. After many years of marriage, she gives birth to a beautiful baby daughter, whom she and her husband name Aurora. Their happiness is short-lived; Maleficent, who wasn't invited, curses the child. Devastated, she sees her daughter taken away by the fairies, for the girl's own protection. Sixteen years later, Leah anticipates the return of her daughter; but when Aurora touches the spindle, the Queen and their entire kingdom are put in an enchanted sleep by the good Fairies. When Maleficent is defeated and Aurora awakened by Phillip, Leah awakens with her royal husband and their entire domain. The Queen finally meets her daughter, whom she tearfully embraces.

In the short segment, Stefan, Leah, Hubert, and Phillip all go off on a royal ceremony where Hubert is due to give a speech. Trusting their daughter, Stefan and Leah give Aurora the "keys to the kingdom" while they're away.

In Disney's 2014 live-action reboot Maleficent, Queen Leah - renamed Queen Leila  - was portrayed by Hannah New. She is the daughter and only child of ruthless King Henry, Stefan's predecessor. Leila remains loyal to her father by becoming Stefan's wife, and by bearing his eventual heir. She witnesses Maleficent - her husband's childhood friend, whom he ultimately betrayed - place a curse on their daughter Aurora. Shortly before Aurora's 16th birthday, Leila becomes ill and dies offscreen. Stefan shows no grief; he has become paranoid and obsessed with killing Maleficent, although he does note his daughter's resemblance to her mother.

Queen Leah also briefly appears in the Disney Channel Original Movie Descendants. She meets Mal, daughter of Maleficent, and blames her for Maleficent's actions. She is seen at the coronation holding on to her granddaughter Audrey after they got frozen by Maleficent.

King Hubert

King Hubert is Phillip's father, voiced by Bill Thompson. King Hubert and his best friend, King Stefan, had betrothed their children to marry each other when the time comes, so that their kingdoms remain forever united. He is invited to Aurora's christening and witnesses Maleficent cursing Aurora. Though the baby princess Aurora is taken away by Flora, Fauna and Merryweather, the betrothal remains the same. Hubert is next seen as sixteen years have passed and Stefan is preparing the celebration for Aurora's return. King Hubert and King Stefan are talking about their children and their kingdoms when the conversation almost results in a fight until both kings realize they are about to fight for no reason. The scene is interrupted by Phillip's arrival. Prince Phillip tells his father that he has met a young woman in the forest and that he will marry her, against his father's will. Unbeknownst to Hubert, this young woman is Aurora under the disguise of "Briar Rose", the fake identity the fairies have given her to protect her from Maleficent. King Hubert is enraged at his son for even entertaining the notion of marrying a peasant girl, but Phillip, somewhat humorously says to his father royalty must start considering new ideas, for "it is the 14th Century, after all". Dismayed at failing to dissuade his son from his expected betrothal, Hubert proceeds to tell King Stefan the bad news. During these events, Maleficent's curse has been fulfilled and Aurora has fallen into a deep sleep, so the fairies decide to put everyone else asleep. Just as he is falling asleep, King Hubert is telling an already sleeping King Stefan that Phillip is in love with a peasant girl, which makes Flora realize that it was Phillip whom Aurora met in the forest. King Hubert wakes up at the end of the film, resuming his conversation with King Stefan and is about to tell him that Phillip loves a peasant girl when Aurora and Phillip are seen coming down the hall staircase, which leaves Hubert confused but satisfied.

King Hubert is one of the characters from Sleeping Beauty that return in Disney Princess Enchanted Tales: Follow Your Dreams, now voiced by Jeff Bennett. He attends a Royal Conference along with Prince Phillip, King Stefan and Queen Leah, in which King Hubert is due to give a speech. However, King Hubert realizes he has forgotten his speech at King Stefan's castle only when he is already at the Royal Conference. King Hubert tries to find it everywhere until the fairies arrive and deliver him his speech. Hubert is next seen at the end of the film, attending a meal organized by Aurora.

In Maleficent: Mistress of Evil, he is portrayed by Robert Lindsay and renamed to King John of Ulstead, along with his wife, Queen Ingrith. Unlike Ingrith, he seeks to establish peace between Ulstead and the Moors. Following his son's engagement, John and Ingrith hold a banquet, to celebrate the young couples upcoming nuptials. During the dinner, tensions rise while Maleficent and Ingrith discuss the fatalities on their respective sides, each claiming the other is responsible. When Maleficent loses her temper, Ingrith enacts her secret plan to overthrow the king, by cursing him with a spindle, and blaming Maleficent. Now under a sleeping curse, Phillip urges his mother to kiss John, falsely believing in their relationship, but it doesn't work, as Ingrith secretly despises her husband for desiring peace. The King's cursed state sets off the motions, resulting in a war between Ulstead and magical beings of the Moors, as well as the Dark Fey.

Afterwards Prince Phillip ends the war between Ulstead and all the fairies and Ingrith is turned into a goat for her tyranny, Maleficent destroys the spindle and breaks the curse, awakening the king. He is later seen attending the wedding between Aurora and Phillip at the end, telling Phillip how proud he is of him for succeeding in achieving peace between Ulstead and the Moors.

Although he doesn't directly appear in Maleficent, he sends his son Prince Phillip, to King Stefan's castle.

Diablo the Raven

Diablo is Maleficent's pet raven. The source of his name is not clear as he is never named in the film. Diablo is present at Aurora's christening, during which Maleficent curses the baby. When Maleficent's goons inform their mistress that they have spent sixteen years searching for a baby, she sends Diablo to look for Aurora. Diablo flies over the forest looking for any sign of the princess until he discovers the cottage where she is living with the fairies due to some magic caused by Flora and Merryweather. After informing his mistress, Diablo joins Maleficent as she and the goons capture Phillip in the cottage, and notices the fairies' presence in the Forbidden Mountain while Maleficent is unaware of it. Diablo later discovers that Phillip has escaped with the fairies' aid, and commands the goons to stop them from leaving the mountain. Merryweather returns and chases Diablo round Maleficent's tower until she turns him into a stone raven, but the raven was able to attract attention to Maleficent who learned about his fate and the escaping Prince Phillip. He was voiced by Candy Candido in the original film and is currently voiced by Sam Riley.

Diablo plays a small but vital role in the Kingdom Hearts video game series: First in Kingdom Hearts II where he carried Maleficent's cloak into Yen Sid's tower to ensure her revival, and then Kingdom Hearts: Dream Drop Distance to deliver a message to Mickey. In the games he is referred to just as "Maleficent's Raven".

Diablo is portrayed by Sam Riley in the live-action 2014 reboot Maleficent; renamed Diaval, he is introduced as a captured raven, whom Maleficent rescues by empowering him to shapeshift at will. The grateful Diaval pledges himself to Maleficent's service, becoming her closest confidante as well as her aide-de-camp. His most common forms are a raven and a man. Over the course of the film, however, Diaval transforms into additional creatures - notably a horse, a wolf, a bear, and a dragon - as Maleficent requires. Ultimately, Diaval and Maleficent retire together, leaving now-Queen Aurora to rule both their kingdoms.

Samson the Horse
Samson is Prince Phillip's pet horse, who appears in the two films. He is very fond of Aurora, but can become jealous when Phillip shows affection towards her. He is voiced by Frank Welker in Disney Princess Enchanted Tales: Follow Your Dreams.

Maleficent's Goons

Maleficent's army is made up of goblin-type creatures that resemble boars, hawks, alligators, goats, bats, vultures, and other creatures. Though loyal, the goons have low intelligence as, due to unclear orders from Maleficent who is infuriated with their stupidity, they spent 16 years searching for an infant Aurora rather than a girl of proper age. The goons later appear to capture Prince Phillip in the cottage where the three fairies were hiding Aurora, and again attempting to thwart his escape by pushing boulders (Flora turns them into bubbles), shooting arrows (Flora turns them into flowers), and pouring boiling oil (Flora turns it into a rainbow).

The goons make cameo appearances in the film Who Framed Roger Rabbit (1988) in Maroon Cartoon Studios, the TV series House of Mouse as recurring guests, and the video game Kingdom Hearts: Birth By Sleep as minor enemies.

References

External links

 
Lists of Disney animated film characters